The Redback Buzzard is an Australian helicopter that was designed and produced by Redback Aviation of Hoppers Crossing, Victoria. The aircraft was intended to be supplied as a kit for amateur construction, but only one prototype was ever completed and development ended.

Design and development
The Buzzard was based on the second generation Star Aviation LoneStar helicopter to which Redback own the rights. The Buzzard was designed to be a minimalist helicopter, using a maximum of off-the-shelf parts and to comply with the homebuilt aircraft rules. It features a single main rotor, a single-seat open cockpit without a windshield, skid-type landing gear and a Suzuki  four stroke engine.

The aircraft fuselage is made from bolted-together aluminum tubing, with the tailboom built from carbon fibre. The main rotor transmission uses a combination of V-belts and toothed belts. Pitch link controls are mounted inside the hollow rotor mast tube.

The company indicates that only one prototype was built and that it was sold, ending development of the aircraft, in favour of a new design, the Redback Aviation Spider.

Specifications (version)

References

External links

2000s Australian sport aircraft
2000s Australian helicopters
Homebuilt aircraft
Single-engined piston helicopters
Redback Aviation aircraft